Federal Route 98, or Jalan Temerloh-Jerantut, is a main federal road in Pahang, Malaysia. The roads connects Jerantut in the north to Temerloh in the south. It is also a main route to East Coast Expressway via Temerloh Interchange and also Taman Negara. 
The route starts at Temerloh, at its interchange with the Federal Route 87.

Features

The Federal Route 98 was built under the JKR R5 road standard, allowing a maximum speed limit of up to 90 km/h.

List of junctions and towns

References

Malaysian Federal Roads